The 2015 FIBA Europe Under-16 Championship was the 29th edition of the European Under-16 Basketball Championship. 16 teams participated in the competition, held in Kaunas, Lithuania in two venues (Arvydas Sabonis Basketball Centre and the legendary Kaunas Sports Hall), from 8 to 16 August 2015. France was the defending champions.

Venues

Participating teams

 
  (3rd place, 2014 FIBA Europe Under-16 Championship Division B)

  (Runners-up, 2014 FIBA Europe Under-16 Championship Division B)
 

 
  (Winners, 2014 FIBA Europe Under-16 Championship Division B)

First round
In this round, sixteen teams are allocated in four groups of four teams each. The top three teams of each group will advance to the Qualifying Round. The last teams will play in the Classification Group G first, then in the 9th–16th place playoffs.

Group A

Group B

Group C

Group D

Second round
Twelve advancing teams from the First Round will be allocated in two groups of six teams each. The top four teams of each group will advance to the quarterfinals. The last two teams of each group will play in the 9th – 16th place playoffs against the teams from the Group G.

Group E

Group F

Classification Group G
The last team of each group of the First Round will compete in this Classification Round.

Classification playoffs for 9th – 16th place

Classification games for 9th – 16th place

Classification games for 13th – 16th place

Classification games for 9th – 12th place

Championship playoffs

Quarterfinals

Classification games for 5th to 8th place

Semifinals

Final classification games

Match for 15th place

Match for 13th place

Match for 11th place

Match for 9th place

Match for 7th place

Match for 5th place

Bronze medal match

Final

Final standings

Awards 

All-Tournament Team

 Arnas Velička
 Onuralp Bitim
 Džanan Musa
 Njegoš Sikiraš
 Ahmet Duran

References

External links
FIBA official website

 
FIBA U16 European Championship
2015–16 in European basketball
2015–16 in Lithuanian basketball
International youth basketball competitions hosted by Lithuania
Sports competitions in Kaunas
August 2015 sports events in Europe
21st century in Kaunas